Darreh Zhaleh-ye Sofla (also Romanized as Darreh Zhāleh-ye Soflá; also known as Darreh Zhāleh-ye Pā'īn) is a village in Ozgoleh Rural District, Ozgoleh District, Salas-e Babajani County, Kermanshah Province, Iran. At the 2006 census, its population was 187, in 46 families.

References 

Populated places in Salas-e Babajani County